David Alexander Howell (born 23 June 1975) is an English professional golfer. His career peaked in 2006, when he won the BMW Championship and was ranked in the top 10 of the Official World Golf Ranking for a short time. He played in the Ryder Cup in 2004 and 2006.

Career
After training and competing at Broome Manor Golf Club, he became a professional golfer in 1995. He won the 1998 Australian PGA Championship, and the 1999 Dubai Desert Classic. He had no further wins for six years, but his form was nonetheless on a general upwards curve. He was tenth on the European Tour Order of Merit in 2004 and 2005 proved to be even better. In the spring he had back to back second places in The Daily Telegraph Dunlop Masters and the Nissan Irish Open, and in August, won the BMW International Open. By the autumn he reached the top 20 in the world rankings.

In November 2005, he won the inaugural HSBC Champions tournament, the first event of the 2006 European Tour season. The win took him to a career high of number 13 in the Official World Golf Ranking, making him the highest-ranked British player and the second highest-ranked European at that time. In May 2006, he won the BMW Championship and moved into the world top ten for the first time. In June he moved to a new high of ninth. After leading the Order of Merit for most of the 2006 season, he eventually finished in 3rd place; a back injury caused his form to suffer in the latter half of the season and limited his appearances through 2007. 

In 2013, Howell had his first European Tour win in seven years at the Alfred Dunhill Links Championship, beating American Peter Uihlein in a playoff. Howell had previously gone 0–4 in European Tour playoffs.

In 2014, Howell became the second youngest player in history to reach 500 appearances on European Tour when he played at the Open de France. 

Howell won the Beko Classic, a tournament sanctioned by the PGAs of Europe, by 5 shots after rounds of 70, 69 and 67 at the Montgomerie Maxx Royal in Turkey in 2015.

The season 2017 proved to be Howell's most disappointing on tour and, speaking in December, said it had been 'two years of hell'. His season was ravaged by back and wrist injuries and he made only five halfway cuts from 20 events, the fewest he has ever made in a whole season resulting in his worst ever Order of Merit ranking.

He suffered another injury setback in January 2018 with a shoulder injury forcing him to retire from the BMW South African Open.

At the Nordea Masters in August 2018, Howell became just the tenth player in the European Tour's history to reach 600 career appearances.

Howell was a member of the winning European Ryder Cup teams in 2004 and 2006. As a member of the Great Britain & Ireland team in the Seve Trophy he was on the losing side in 2000, but a winner in 2003. He has also represented Europe at the Royal Trophy twice in 2006 and 2013 and has been on the winning side on both occasions. He came from 3 down with 4 to play to win his singles match in 2013 against Kim Hyung-sung as Europe pulled off an impressive fightback. 

In 2014, Howell was named as part of a five-man selection panel deciding Europe's 2016 Ryder Cup captain. The panel unanimously appointed Darren Clarke to the role.

In January 2017, it was announced that Howell had been voted unanimously to succeed Thomas Bjørn as chairman of the European Tour's Tournament Committee. 

In August 2022 at the Cazoo Classic, Howell became just the third player, after Sam Torrence and Miguel Angel Jimenez, to reach 700 career appearances on the European Tour and the youngest to ever do so.

Howell is represented by Octagon.

He also occasionally works for Sky Sports as a commentator and analyst as well as writing regular columns for The Golf Paper and Worldwide Golf. He is sponsored by Titleist and plays with the Titleist ProV1x ball. He was sponsored by Adams Golf for three years from May 2013 but has since returned to TaylorMade.

Amateur wins
1993 Boys Amateur Championship

Professional wins (7)

European Tour wins (5)

1Co-sanctioned by the Asian Tour, Sunshine Tour and PGA Tour of Australasia

European Tour playoff record (1–4)

PGA Tour of Australasia wins (2)

1Co-sanctioned by the European Tour, Asian Tour and Sunshine Tour

Other wins (1)

Results in major championships

CUT = missed the halfway cut
WD = withdrew
"T" indicates a tie for a place.

Summary

Most consecutive cuts made – 3 (twice)
Longest streak of top-10s – 1

Results in The Players Championship

CUT = missed the halfway cut
WD = withdrew
"T" indicates a tie for a place

Results in World Golf Championships

QF, R16, R32, R64 = Round in which player lost in match play
"T" = tied
Note that the HSBC Champions did not become a WGC event until 2009.

Team appearances
Amateur
Jacques Léglise Trophy (representing Great Britain & Ireland): 1993 (winners)
European Youths' Team Championship (representing England): 1994
Walker Cup (representing Great Britain & Ireland): 1995

Professional
Alfred Dunhill Cup (representing England): 1999
Seve Trophy (representing Great Britain & Ireland): 2000, 2003 (winners), 2005 (winners)
Ryder Cup (representing Europe): 2004 (winners), 2006 (winners)
WGC-World Cup (representing England): 2005, 2006
Royal Trophy (representing Europe): 2006 (winners), 2013 (winners)

References

External links

English male golfers
European Tour golfers
PGA Tour golfers
Ryder Cup competitors for Europe
Sportspeople from Swindon
People from Virginia Water
1975 births
Living people